Bill Edwards (3 July 1933 – 22 August 2018) was an Australian rules footballer who played with Richmond in the Victorian Football League (VFL).

Notes

External links 
		

Profile at Tiger Archive

2018 deaths
1933 births
Australian rules footballers from Victoria (Australia)
Richmond Football Club players
Moorabbin Football Club players